Pseudobarbus is a ray-finned fish genus in the family Cyprinidae. The type species is Burchell's redfin (P. burchelli). The scientific name is derived from the Ancient Greek pseudes ("false") and the Latin word barbus ("beard", in reference to the barbels of barbs). This genus contains some (and might contain all) of the South African redfins. It was originally proposed as a subgenus, but has since been found worthy of recognition as a full genus.

This genus is restricted to southern Africa; all of its species were formerly placed in Barbus, the genus of typical  barbels and their relatives. One taxon was originally described as P. leonhardi – this, however, was a European fish for which the genus was erroneously proposed anew. It has since turned out to be nothing other than the barbel B. peloponnesius.

Species and systematics
Pseudobarbus was placed in the paraphyletic "subfamily" Barbinae by those that recognize that group, but if not included in the Cyprininae outright it might – like the other small African barbs – belong to an as yet unnamed subfamily.

Currently, 15 recognized species are placed in this genus:
Pseudobarbus afer W. K. H. Peters, 1864 (Eastern Cape redfin)
Pseudobarbus asper Boulenger, 1911 (small-scale redfin)
Pseudobarbus burchelli A. Smith, 1841 (Burchell's redfin)
Pseudobarbus burgi Boulenger, 1911 (Berg River redfin)
Pseudobarbus calidus Barnard, 1938 (Clanwilliam redfin)
Pseudobarbus capensis – Cape whitefish, Berg-breede River whitefish
Pseudobarbus erubescens P. H. Skelton, 1974 (Twee redfin)
Pseudobarbus hospes Barnard, 1938 (Namaquab barb)
Pseudobarbus phlegethon Barnard, 1938 (fiery redfin)
Pseudobarbus quathlambae Barnard, 1938 (Maluti redfin)
Pseudobarbus serra W. K. H. Peters, 1864 (sawfin)
Pseudobarbus skeltoni Chakona & Swartz, 2013 (giant redfin)
Pseudobarbus tenuis Barnard, 1938 (slender redfin)
 Pseudobarbus trevelyani Günther, 1877 (Border barb)
Pseudobarbus verloreni Chakona, Swartz & P. H. Skelton, 2014 (Verlorenvlei redfin)

Some South African "redfin" barb were previously placed in Barbus, mainly due to a lack of taxonomic and systematic study of that huge "wastebin genus". They formed a clade distinct from the traditional Pseudobarbus and were more plesiomorphic. Certainly, they did not belong in the typical barbel:

References

Further reading

External links

 
 
Cyprinidae genera